Miami High School may refer to:

Miami High School (Arizona), Miami, Arizona
Miami High School (Oklahoma), Miami, Oklahoma
Miami East High School, Casstown, Ohio
Miami Senior High School, Miami, Florida
Miami State High School, Miami, Queensland, Australia
Miami Trace High School, Washington Court House, Ohio
Little Miami High School, Morrow, Ohio
Miami School, Miami, Texas

See also
 Miami-Dade County Public Schools, a public school district serving Miami-Dade County, Florida
 Education in Miami, Florida